The 2011–12 season was the 67th season in VfL Wolfsburg's football history.

Season summary
Wolfsburg finished 8th in the Bundesliga, rising from 15th the previous season, but were knocked out in the first round of the DFB Pokal.

Players

First-team squad
Squad at end of season

Left club during season

References

External links

VfL Wolfsburg seasons
Wolfsburg